Wilhelm "Willy" Simetsreiter (16 March 1915 – 17 July 2001), popularly known as Schimmy, was a German footballer.

A native of Munich, Simetsreiter played his career along the left wing for his club Bayern Munich. He is usually considered the fastest-ever player at this position in the club's history.

He scored three goals against Luxembourg on 4 August at the 1936 Summer Olympics in Berlin.He was also part of Germany's squad at the 1936 Summer Olympics.  At the time, the 21-year-old was one of the youngest players in the national side to score a hat-trick. During the 1930s, Simetsreiter was capped a total of eight times by the Germany national football team.

References

External links
 
 
 
 
 
 

1915 births
2001 deaths
German footballers
Footballers at the 1936 Summer Olympics
FC Bayern Munich footballers
Germany international footballers
Footballers from Munich
Olympic footballers of Germany
Association football midfielders
German footballers needing infoboxes